Cheongnyeonsa is a temple located in Yeongdeok County, Gyeongsangbuk-do, South Korea.

References 

Buddhist temples of the Jogye Order
Buddhist temples in South Korea
Buildings and structures in North Gyeongsang Province
Yeongdeok County